Melittomma pervagum is a species of beetle in the family Lymexylidae. It was described by Arthur Sidney Olliff in 1889. It is known from Australia, from Lord Howe Island.

References

Lymexylidae
Beetles described in 1889
Taxa named by Arthur Sidney Olliff